Art Palm Beach is an international modern and contemporary art fair in The Palm Beaches. The fair, founded in 1997, is held in West Palm Beach and exhibits the works of international artists, ranging from "the most promising emerging talent" to masters. Art work exhibited includes photography, painting, design, fine art glass, sculpture, and video. Art Palm Beach is the largest fair of its kind in the Palm Beaches in terms of attendance, square footage, and total sales conducted by its exhibitors.
Founded in 1997, Art Palm Beach is an international modern and contemporary art fair in The Palm Beaches. The fair features a diverse range of artistic disciplines, including photography, painting, design, fine art glass, sculpture and video, Art Palm Beach is the largest fair of its kind in the Palm Beaches in attendance, square footage and total sales generated by its exhibitors. The fair is held at the Palm Beach County Convention Center in West Palm Beach.

History
Art Palm Beach was established in  South Florida in 1997. It is the longest running mid-winter fair dedicated to contemporary, emerging and modern masterworks of 20th and 21st century art.

Acquired by the Palm Beach Show Group in 2022, Art Palm Beach was previously organized by IFAE/Next Level fair founders David and Lee Ann Lester, original founders of Art Miami, Art Asia Hong Kong, American International Fine Art Fair and Art Boca Raton.

Video, performance art, art installations and new technologies have become unique features of the fair, offering collectors exposure to today’s emerging art trends.

Organizer: Palm Beach Show Group 
Palm Beach Show Group, owner of the LA Art Show, acquired Art Palm Beach in 2022. Art Palm Beach resumes in January 2023 under the new leadership of KASSANDRA VOYAGIS, manager and director of the LA Art Show.

Exhibitors
 Jean Arcelin
 Humberto Calzada
 Li Chen
 David Datuna
 Josignacio
 István Sándorfi
 Lino Tagliapietra
 Alexi Torres
 The Holoverse
Marcel Katz
The Directed Art Modern

See also
 Art Basel
 Frieze Art Fair
 Art exhibition
 Arts festival
Palm Beach

References

External links
 Official site

Art fairs
Art exhibitions in the United States